Pathogenicity islands (PAIs), as termed in 1990, are a distinct class of genomic islands acquired by microorganisms through horizontal gene transfer. Pathogenicity islands are found in both animal and plant pathogens. Additionally, PAIs are found in both gram-positive and gram-negative bacteria. They are transferred through horizontal gene transfer events such as transfer by a plasmid, phage, or conjugative transposon. Therefore, PAIs contribute to microorganisms' ability to evolve.

One species of bacteria may have more than one PAI. For example, Salmonella has at least five.

An analogous genomic structure in rhizobia is termed a symbiosis island.

Properties
Pathogenicity islands (PAIs) are gene clusters incorporated in the genome, chromosomally or extrachromosomally, of pathogenic organisms, but are usually absent from those nonpathogenic organisms of the same or closely related species. They may be located on a bacterial chromosome or may be transferred within a plasmid or can be found in bacteriophage genomes. The GC-content and codon usage of pathogenicity islands often differs from that of the rest of the genome, potentially aiding in their detection within a given DNA sequence, unless the donor and recipient of the PAI have similar GC-content.

PAIs are discrete genetic units flanked by direct repeats, insertion sequences or tRNA genes, which act as sites for recombination into the DNA. Cryptic mobility genes may also be present, indicating the provenance as transduction. PAIs are flanked by direct repeats; the sequence of bases at two ends of the inserted sequence are the same. They carry functional genes, such as integrases, transposases, phagocytosis, or part of insertion sequences, to enable insertion into host DNA. PAIs are often associated with tRNA genes, which target sites for this integration event. They can be transferred as a single unit to new bacterial cells, thus conferring virulence to formerly benign strains.

PAIs, a type of mobile genetic element, may range from 10-200 kb and encode genes which contribute to the virulence of the respective pathogen. Pathogenicity islands carry genes encoding one or more virulence factors, including, but not limited to, adhesins, secretion systems (like type III secretion system), toxins, invasins, modulins, effectors, superantigens, iron uptake systems, o-antigen synthesis, serum resistance, immunoglobulin A proteases, apoptosis, capsule synthesis, and plant tumorigenesis via Agrobacterium tumefaciens.

There are various combinations of regulation involving pathogenicity islands. The first combination is that the pathogenicity island contains the genes to regulate the virulence genes encoded on the PAI. The second combination is that the pathogenicity island contains the genes to regulate genes located outside of the pathogenecity island. Additionally, regulatory genes outside of the PAI may regulate virulence genes in the pathogenicity island. Regulation genes typically encoded on PAIs include AraC-like proteins and two-component response regulators.

PAIs can be considered unstable DNA regions as they are susceptible to deletions or mobilization. This may be due to the structure of PAIs, with direct repeats, insertion sequences and association with tRNA that enables deletion and mobilization at higher frequencies. Additionally, deletions of pathogenicity islands inserted in the genome can result in disrupting tRNA and subsequently affect the metabolism of the cell.

Examples
The P fimbriae island contains virulence factors such as haemolysin, pili, cytotoxic necrosing factor, and uropathogenic specific protein (USP).
Yersinia pestis high pathogenicity island I has genes regulating iron uptake and storage.
Salmonella SP1 and SP2 sites.
Rhodococcus equi virulence plasmid pathogenicity island encodes virulence factors for proliferation in macrophages.
The SaPI family of Staphylococcus aureus pathogenicity islands, mobile genetic elements, encode superantigens, including the gene for toxic shock syndrome toxin, and are mobilized at high frequencies by specific bacteriophages.
Phage encoded Cholera toxin of Vibrio cholerae, Diphtheria toxin of Corynebacterium diphtheriae, Neurotoxins of Clostridium botulinum and Cytotoxin of Pseudomonas aeruginosa.
Helicobacter pylori has two strains, one being more virulent than the other due to the presence of the Cag pathogenicity island.

References

External links
BAC definition of pathogenicity

Genetics